Bailte Seirbhíse Gaeltachta is the Irish language term for Gaeltacht Service Towns, whose designations were legislated for under the Gaeltacht Act 2012. Gaeltacht Service Towns are towns situated in or adjacent to Gaeltacht areas in Ireland, that have a population of over 1,000 people, and which play a significant role in providing public services, recreational and commercial facilities for Gaeltacht residents.

History

In 2016 it was announced that Galway City, Dingle and Letterkenny would be the first designated Gaeltacht Service Towns subject to local networks co-formulating and adopting approved Irish language plans in conjunction with Foras na Gaeilge and Údarás na Gaeltachta. Cork City, Macroom, Belmullet, Ballinrobe, Clifden, Cahersiveen, Navan and Athboy have also been mentioned by the Dept. of the Gaeltacht as possible towns which may become Gaeltacht Service Towns.

In August 2020 the Department of Media, Tourism, Arts, Culture, Sport and the Gaeltacht announced that Dingle and Letterkenny have been officially recognised by the department as the first two Gaeltacht Service Towns. Since then Galway City, Dungloe, Tralee, Dungarvan and Castlebar have been recognised as Gaeltacht Service Towns.

See also

 Gaeltacht Irish speaking regions in Ireland.
 Gaeltacht Act 2012
 Údarás na Gaeltachta The Gaeltacht Authority.
 Líonraí Gaeilge Irish Language Networks outside the Gaeltacht whose development was also legislated for under the Gaeltacht Act 2012.
 Irish language outside Ireland
 Scottish Gaelic Gaeilge na hAlban / Gàidhlig.

References

Irish words and phrases